Abdulla Aboobacker is an Indian athlete who competes in triple jump.

Results

References

External links
 

1996 births
Living people
Athletes from Kerala
Indian male triple jumpers
Athletes (track and field) at the 2022 Commonwealth Games
Commonwealth Games silver medallists for India
Commonwealth Games medallists in athletics
Medallists at the 2022 Commonwealth Games